The 2022 Northern Iowa Panthers football team represented the University of Northern Iowa in the 2022 NCAA Division I FCS football season. The Panthers competed as members of the Missouri Valley Football Conference and were led by 22nd-year head coach Mark Farley. They played their home games at UNI-Dome in Cedar Falls, Iowa.

Previous season

The Panthers finished the 2021 season with an overall record of 6–6 and a mark of 4–4 in MVFC play to finish in sixth. They received an at-large bid to the FCS playoffs, where they lost in the first round to Eastern Washington.

Schedule

Roster

Game Summaries

at Air Force

North Dakota

No. 8 Sacramento State

at Western Illinois

Indiana State

Illinois State

Utah Tech

Missouri State

at No. 20 Southern Illinois

No. 1 South Dakota State

at South Dakota

References

Northern Iowa
Northern Iowa Panthers football seasons
Northern Iowa Panthers football